Park View Education Centre is a Canadian public secondary school located in the town of Bridgewater, Nova Scotia. It is operated by the South Shore Regional School Board (SSRSB).

Park View Education Centre has been an International Baccalaureate World School since June 1980, optionally offering the IB Diploma Programme. IB courses available at the school include Visual Arts SL, Biology SL, Chemistry HL, Economics SL, English A1 HL, French B HL, French B SL, History HL, History SL, Mathematics SL, Music SL, Physics HL, Physics SL and Theory of Knowledge.

External links
School's website
School's IB information

Bridgewater, Nova Scotia
High schools in Nova Scotia
International Baccalaureate schools in Nova Scotia
Schools in Lunenburg County, Nova Scotia